Kélo Airstrip  is a public use airport located near Kélo, Tandjilé, Chad.

See also
List of airports in Chad

References

External links 
 Airport record for Kélo Airstrip at Landings.com

Airports in Chad
Tandjilé Region